Saint Paul Island can refer to:

 Île Saint-Paul, a small island in the French Southern Territories
 Saint Paul Island (Alaska), United States
 St. Paul Island (Nova Scotia), Canada
 Saint Peter and Saint Paul Archipelago, Brazil
 St Paul's Island, Malta
 Nuns' Island, originally Île Saint-Paul, part of Montreal city, Canada